The nineteenth season of Law & Order: Special Victims Unit premiered on September 27, 2017 and finished on May 23, 2018 with a two-part season finale. Michael S. Chernuchin, who had previously worked on Law & Order, Law & Order: Criminal Intent, and Chicago Justice took over from Rick Eid as showrunner. This is also the first season since season twelve in 2010–2011 where another Law & Order series—Law & Order True Crime: The Menendez Murders—aired alongside SVU on NBC.

Production
Law & Order: Special Victims Unit was renewed for a 19th season on May 12, 2017. Chernuchin took over from Eid as showrunner after Eid left SVU to be showrunner for the fifth season of Chicago P.D. Production on the season started on July 20, 2017. On January 9, 2018, NBC ordered an extra two episodes for Season 19, as confirmed in a tweet by Robert Brooks Cohen, rounding the episode count to 24.

Storylines
Chernuchin told The Hollywood Reporter that this season of SVU would involve more ripped-from-the-headlines plots focusing on current events such as the Charlottesville riots. "Conflict. It's just the state of the world today with everybody," he said. "Everybody's political now and everything is political now, and we want to deal with that." 

THR's Kate Stanhope also asked Chernuchin about the pulled episode ("Unstoppable") from the previous season, asking him if he was hesitant about diving into politics. Chernuchin replied, "I'm not going to choose a side. I won't choose a side. I'm going to present both political views and let the audience decide which one is right. My goal, and I told the writers on this on the first day of our writers' room, is at the end of every episode, I want half the audience to throw their shoes at the television and the other half to stand up and cheer."

Chernuchin told THR that another episode would be based on the Charlie Gard case, an infant in England who was born with a rare genetic disorder that causes progressive brain damage and muscle failure. "That's a life-and-death story," Chernuchin explained. Other episodes were alluded to as "[SVU's] answer to 13 Reasons Why — and an airplane episode covering "all the turmoil on airplanes these days." Chernuchin concluded, "We are ripping things from the headlines. Some of them are big, famous headlines and some of them are smaller headlines."

On September 8, 2017, Chernuchin gave an overview of the season premiere and outlook on the season as a whole to TV Line; noting that ADA Barba (Raúl Esparza) would start having other problems than court battles when Peter Stone (Philip Winchester) shows up, pushing Barba into "a huge moral decision." Chernuchin also teased that Lieutenant Benson's life would be getting worse before it gets any better. "What I told Mariska [Hargitay] when I came aboard is, 'You're a broken woman, because of your past, and I'm going to drag you through the woods and you're gonna come out the other side a better person," he previewed. "So we're gonna throw the kitchen sink at her [Benson]." 

He also mentioned there's a possibility of romance for Benson: "There might be, she's not looking for it, but it might happen." In an interview with E! News, Kelli Giddish (Det. Amanda Rollins) says a change in Benson and Rollins' relationship dynamic is coming. "I'm so looking forward to developing a friendship with Benson, the Rollins and Benson relationship, because they have so much in common." Benson and Rollins' relationship was rocky, most notably between seasons 15 and 18 as the former began moving up the ranks to sergeant and then lieutenant. "They have been at odds, it's just nice to come into that office and know that we're not going to fight but kind of support each other as I think these two characters would in real life," Giddish continued.

An episode based on the Harvey Weinstein sexual abuse allegations aired on January 17, 2018. "We are hitting Harvey Weinstein head-on, but it's not in the realm of the entertainment business," Chernuchin said in an interview with Entertainment Weekly. "It's a real important episode about the rape culture in an industry, and we wanted to try [to] stretch the law to criminalize that sort of environment."

Cast

The entire main cast from the previous season returned. In August 2017, it was announced that Philip Winchester would reprise his role as Assistant State's Attorney Peter Stone from Chicago Justice, appearing around the midpoint of the season. New show runner/executive producer Michael Chernuchin told Entertainment Weekly that Stone's character would be coming in as an antagonist and that he will be a foil for A.D.A. Barba (Raúl Esparza) this season; Stone's character isn't necessarily taking his [Barba's] job. "There's more than one A.D.A. in New York [...] Philip will come in and he won't be the nicest person our characters have ever met. What he's going to be doing, too, is basically bringing all of the franchises into one. He's connecting Law & Order, the Chicago franchises and now SVU." His character debuted in the thirteenth episode of the season. In the thirteenth episode, Raúl Esparza departed the cast after six seasons on the show. He told Natalie Abrams of Entertainment Weekly that it was his decision to leave, adding "I've done six seasons, I felt like it was time to go. I had explored a lot of what I thought Barba was about. I just felt it was time to move on." Philip Winchester took his place as the show's permanent A.D.A, guest starring in Esparza's final episode before joining the main cast in the fourteenth episode.

Main cast
 Mariska Hargitay as Lieutenant Olivia Benson
 Kelli Giddish as Junior Detective Amanda Rollins
 Ice-T as Senior Detective / Sergeant Odafin "Fin" Tutuola
 Peter Scanavino as Junior Detective Dominick "Sonny" Carisi, Jr.
 Raúl Esparza as Assistant District Attorney Rafael Barba (episodes 1–13)
 Philip Winchester as Assistant District Attorney Peter Stone (episodes 14–24)

Crossover stars
 Sam Waterston as District Attorney Jack McCoy (Crossing over with Law & Order)
 Carolyn McCormick as Dr. Elizabeth Olivet (Crossing over with Law & Order)

Recurring cast

 Dean Winters as District Attorney Investigator Brian Cassidy
 Ryan Buggle as Noah Porter-Benson
 Charlotte Cabell and Vivian Cabell as Jesse Rollins 
 Barbara Miluski as Judge Lisa Peck
 Peter Jacobson as Defense Attorney Randy Dworkin
 Vincent Curatola as Judge Al Burtuccio
 Brooke Shields as Sheila Porter
 Yvonna Kopacz-Wright as Dr. Darcy Wilder
 Ami Brabson as Judge Karyn Blake
 Peter Hermann as Defense Attorney Trevor Langan
 Steve Rosen as Defence Attorney Michael Guthrie
 Helmar Augustus Cooper as Judge Reginald Flowers
 Jayne Houdyshell as Judge Ruth Linden
 Kathryn Kates as Judge Marleen Simons
 Peter Gallagher as Deputy Chief William Dodds
 Maureen Mueller as Counselor Susan Janet
 Jenna Stern as Judge Elana Barth
 Tamara Tunie as Medical Examiner Melinda Warner
 Ned Eisenberg as Defense Attorney Roger Kressler

 Sonia Manzano as Judge Gloria Pepitone
 Joe Grifasi as Judge Hashi Horowitz
 Susie Essman as Defense Attorney Arlene Heller
 Bjorn Thorstad as Defense Attorney Mitch Jackson
 Callie Thorne as Defense Attorney Nicki Staines
 Tom Titone as Judge Joshua Goldfarb
 Ernest Waddell as Ken Randall
 Amy Korb as Pamela Stone
 Michael Mastro as Judge Serani
 Mary Hodges as Judge Anita Wright
 Stephanie March as Alexandra Cabot
 Olga Merediz as Judge Roberta Martinez
 Eric Elizaga as Dr. Stephen Hale
 Alan Ariano as Judge Lee Wong
 Lauren Noble as Carmen
 Erica Camarano as Officer Rachel Ortiz
 Eddie Hargitay as Officer Eddie Montero
 John Rothman as Judge Edward Kofax
 Sarah Stephens as Officer Selena Gaines
 Gillian Glasco as Officer Dominique Rivers

Guest stars
On August 11, 2017, it was announced by The Hollywood Reporter that actress Brooke Shields would play a 'major' recurring role throughout the course of the season. "I play a very different character from any I have ever played," Shields commented. "I'm excited to stir the SVU pot a bit." THR noted that details of her role are being kept under wraps, although it's been teased that Shields' role will "shake up Benson's (Mariska Hargitay) world." At the New York Fashion Week event on September 7, 2017, Shields talked about her "complicated" character; "We're discovering the character," she said of her at the time, mysterious recurring role, "it's pretty complicated and it's gut wrenching. What's so amazing about the show is that the characters are so rich and layered, and they're just filtering me through it." Shields also noted that her character was set to begin appearing in the third episode ("Contrapasso") of the season. In that episode's last scene, Shields' character was revealed to be Noah's previously unknown grandmother, Sheila Porter, who challenged Benson for custody before becoming friends. Her story arc finished in January 2018 when Sheila abducted Noah in a cliffhanger episode, before being caught by Benson and the squad and arrested.

On August 18, Entertainment Weekly released a sneak peek of the script of SVU's season 19 premiere episode and announced that Will Chase would be guest starring as Byron Marks, an accused rapist who turned fugitive when he fled to Cuba six years prior, he had establish a new life there with his wife Elana Marks played by Mariela Garriga and their littler daughter. He is caught by Fin (Ice T) in the premiere's opening scenes. Amy Smart guest starred as one of Marks' victims, and Peter Jacobson – who previously guest starred in the thirteenth-season finale and recurred in season fourteen as a pimp named Bart Ganzel – guest starred in the premiere as his recurring mothership Law & Order character, Defense Attorney Randy Dworkin, a character created by Michael Chernuchin during his tenure on L&O. Annabeth Gish guest starred in the third episode of the season. She portrayed a defense attorney in a case where a man is castrated and left for dead; leading the SVU squad to three female suspects with possible motives. Cleveland Cavaliers point guard Isaiah Thomas, made a cameo appearance as himself in an October episode ("Complicated") of SVU. Thomas' cameo appearance occurs in the midst of a missing persons investigation.

Mike Faist, a Tony Award-nominated actor starring as Connor Murphy in Broadway musical Dear Evan Hansen, guest starred as a young man struggling with the long-ago disappearance of his sister in "Complicated". The Walking Dead alum, Brighton Sharbino guest starred as a teenager who disappears when her classmates make her the subject of a cyberbullying attack. Madison Pettis also guest starred in the episode, titled "No Good Reason", which aired on NBC, October 18, 2017. Another Broadway star, Christiane Noll, guest starred in the episode "Unintended Consequences" as Sarah Curtis "After 19 years on the air, I will finally be appearing as a guest star on episode #19006 of Law & Order: SVU! I am really excited because this is my first big guest starring role," Noll told Playbill. Peter Scolari guest starred along with Noll in "Unintended Consequences" as Dr. Dennis Barkley. In October 2017, THR announced Melora Walters and Joanna Going would guest star in a special episode of SVU ("Something Happened"). Walters played the rape victim, Laurel Linwood, who knows she was raped but can't remember what happened. Going played Laurel's sister, Leah, who is brought in to help fill in the blanks.

On September 20, 2017, it was announced Sam Waterston would guest star in an upcoming episode of SVU as his Law & Order character, Jack McCoy. Waterston was re-united with show runner/EP Michael S. Chernuchin, who also held the same position at the time Waterston joined the original series in 1994; Chernuchin is credited as the creator of the McCoy character. This also marked Waterston's fourth guest appearance on SVU. In the episode "Pathological", Tamara Tunie (M.E. Melinda Warner), Carolyn McCormick (Dr. Elizabeth Olivet), and Jenna Stern (Judge Elana Barth) returned as their respective characters. The episode aired on January 10, 2018. McCormick also guest starred in the season finale.

On December 14, 2017, Martin Donovan and Yasmine Al Massri were confirmed to guest star in an episode titled "Flight Risk" based on the Harvey Weinstein sexual abuse allegations. The episode was about sexual assault in the airline industry and aired on January 17, 2018.

On January 31, 2018, Rhea Seehorn guest starred in an episode titled "Info Wars", inspired by the Charlottesville riots and the website InfoWars. Rhea's character was inspired by InfoWars reporter Millie Weaver.

On March 5, 2018, it was revealed that Stephanie March would reprise her role as ADA Alexandra Cabot in an episode titled "Sunk Cost Fallacy" that aired on April 18, 2018. It marked March's first appearance on the show since season thirteen.

Episodes

Ratings

References

19
2017 American television seasons
2018 American television seasons